Brio or BRIO may refer to:

brio, a composer's instruction, meaning "active", "spirited", "alive", or "vigorous"

Arts, entertainment, and media
 Brio (comics), a fictional Marvel Comics cosmic entity, who is one of the Proemial Gods
 Brio (magazine), a magazine from Focus on the Family
 Bree (Narnia) (German: Brio), the titular character in The Horse And His Boy 
 Brio (TV channel), a Slovenian TV channel

Brands and enterprises
 Brio (company), a Swedish toymaking company
 Brio (soft drink), a popular brand of Chinotto soft drink, sold mostly in Canada
 Brio, a popular data warehouse reporting tool now owned by Hyperion Solutions
 Bravo Brio Restaurant Group, a restaurant chain in the United States that includes BRIO Tuscan Grille
 Brio Technology (also known as Brio Software), a software company that was taken over by Hyperion Solutions
 Honda Brio, a hatchback car
 HP Brio, a range of desktop PCs

Other uses
 Architecture Brio, an architecture practice based in Mumbai, India
 Jeanneau Brio, a French sailboat design
 MN Brio typeface
Sun Metro Brio, the express bus service used in El Paso, Texas